Duets II is an album by Tony Bennett, released on September 20, 2011. It was released in conjunction with Bennett's 85th birthday and is a sequel to his previous duet album, Duets: An American Classic. "Don't Get Around Much Anymore" was released on iTunes as a free download on August 2, 2011.

Awards and honors
Duets II debuted at No. 1 on the Billboard 200 chart with 179,000 copies sold, making it his first No. 1 album and making Bennett the oldest living musician to debut at No. 1 on the Billboard 200. Duets II  achieved Platinum sales status in Canada as certified by Music Canada.

The album won the Grammy Award for Best Traditional Pop Vocal Album in 2012, while Bennett and Amy Winehouse won the Grammy for Best Pop Duo or Group Performance for "Body and Soul".

"Body and Soul" was one of Winehouse's favorite songs, and the track, recorded in March 2011, would become Winehouse's final recording before her death a few months later. "Body and Soul" was Bennett's first entry on the Billboard Hot 100 singles chart in nearly 45 years.

Duets II earned arranger Jorge Calandrelli the Grammy for the Best Instrumental Arrangement Accompanying Vocalist(s) for Bennett's duet with Queen Latifah on the track "Who Can I Turn To (When Nobody Needs Me)" The Anthony Newley and Leslie Bricusse standard was featured in the 1964 London West End and Broadway musical The Roar of the Greasepaint, the Smell of the Crowd. Bennett recorded the song late that year and hit the Billboard Top 40  with the single.

Tony Bennett: Portrait of an Artist, the photography of Kelsey Bennett and Josh Cheuse, was on display at The Morrison Hotel Gallery SoHo. The photo exhibit captured the creative essence during the recording process of the legendary artist's new album.

Track listing
The track listing for Duets II was released through the iTunes Store on August 2, 2011.

Charts

Weekly charts

Year-end charts

Decade-end charts

Certifications

References 

2011 albums
Albums produced by Phil Ramone
Columbia Records albums
Grammy Award for Best Traditional Pop Vocal Album
Sequel albums
Tony Bennett albums
Vocal duet albums